Michael Dailly is a Scottish video game designer, best known for designing Lemmings and the original prototype of Grand Theft Auto, and being one of the four founders of DMA Design (now Rockstar North), alongside David Jones, Russell Kay, and Steve Hammond.

Between 2010 and 2018, Dailly was working with YoYo Games as the lead developer of the GameMaker: Studio game engine.

References

20th-century births
Living people
British video game designers
British video game programmers
People from Dundee
Place of birth missing (living people)
Year of birth missing (living people)
Scottish independence activists
Scottish republicans